Mirror Now is an Indian, English-language news channel owned by The Times Group.

It first launched in 2015 as MagicBricks Now, a news channel with a focus on real estate news and information. The network was a collaboration with the Indian real estate website MagicBricks.

On 23 March 2017, MagicBricks Now was replaced by Mirror Now, a news channel with a focus on civic issues. Vinay Tewari is the Managing editor at Mirror Now.

Shows 

 India This Morning: Developing stories of the morning and newsworthy events.
 The News: A general news bulletin with live news updates throughout the day.
 Speed News Now: A snapshot of all the latest news in a rapid-fire presentation style.
 Reporter Live: A news review of the stories that made the headlines since morning. Reporter Live provides an overview of what lies ahead for the remainder of the day.
 Nation Now: A one-hour morning and evening news show that provides the latest news and sports updates from around the country.
 Newsroom Live: A 30-minute news bulletin covering national, international, business, sports, crime, and entertainment news in a fast-paced, crisp and concise manner.
 The Urban Debate: A live debate that covers underreported topics and those that directly affect the residents.
 The Last Word: News editor Tanvi Shukla goes beyond the big issues of the day.
 News Overnight: Live 30-minute telecast that wraps up the important news of the day, with analysis of their possible impact.

References

External links

  

Television stations in Mumbai
Mass media in Mumbai
Business-related television channels
English-language television stations in India
24-hour television news channels in India
Television channels and stations established in 2015
Television channels of The Times Group
2015 establishments in Maharashtra